Clive Eric Cussler (July 15, 1931 – February 24, 2020) was an American adventure novelist and underwater explorer. His thriller novels, many featuring the character Dirk Pitt, have reached The New York Times fiction best-seller list more than 20 times. Cussler was the founder and chairman of the National Underwater and Marine Agency (NUMA), which has discovered more than 60 shipwreck sites and numerous other notable underwater wrecks. He was the sole author or lead author of more than 80 books.

His novels have inspired various other works of fiction.

Early life
Clive Cussler was born in Aurora, Illinois, the son of Amy Adeline (née Hunnewell) and Eric Edward Cussler, and grew up in Alhambra, California. His mother's ancestors were from England and his father was from Germany.

In his memoir The Sea Hunters: True Adventures with Famous Shipwrecks, Cussler revealed that his father fought in the Imperial German Army on the Western Front during World War I. Furthermore, one of Cussler's uncles served in the Imperial German Air Service and became a flying ace, after shooting down 14 Allied aeroplanes.

He was awarded the rank of Eagle Scout when he was 14. He attended Pasadena City College for two years and then enlisted in the United States Air Force during the Korean War. During his service in the Air Force, he was promoted to sergeant and worked as an aircraft mechanic and flight engineer for the Military Air Transport Service (MATS).

Career
After his discharge from the military, Cussler went to work in the advertising industry, first as a copywriter and later as a creative director for two of the nation's most successful advertising agencies. As part of his duties, Cussler produced radio and television commercials, many of which won international awards including an award at the Cannes Lions International Advertising Festival.

Following the publication in 1996 of Cussler's first nonfiction work, The Sea Hunters, he was awarded a Doctor of Letters degree in 1997 by the Board of Governors of the State University of New York Maritime College who accepted the work in lieu of a Ph.D. thesis. This was the first time in the college's 123-year history that such a degree had been awarded.

In 2002, Cussler was awarded the Naval Heritage Award from the U.S. Navy Memorial Foundation for his efforts in the area of marine exploration.

Cussler was a fellow of the Explorers Club of New York, the Royal Geographical Society in London, and the American Society of Oceanographers.

Literary career
Clive Cussler began writing in 1965 when his wife took a job working nights for the local police department where they lived in California. After making dinner for the children and putting them to bed, he had no one to talk to and nothing to do, so he decided to start writing. His most famous creation is marine engineer, government agent and adventurer Dirk Pitt. The Dirk Pitt novels frequently take on an alternative history perspective—such as "what if Atlantis were real?" or "what if Abraham Lincoln wasn't assassinated but was kidnapped?"

The first two Pitt novels, The Mediterranean Caper and Iceberg, were relatively conventional maritime thrillers. The third, Raise the Titanic!, made Cussler's reputation and established the pattern that subsequent Pitt novels would follow: a blend of high adventure and high technology, generally involving megalomaniacal villains, lost ships, beautiful women, and sunken treasure.

Cussler's novels almost always begin with a chapter taking place in the past. These contain none of the novel's main characters and often seem disconnected from the plot until the main characters discover a mystery or secret connecting the events in the first chapter to the rest of the story. This almost always comes in the form of a long-lost artifact that holds the key to the villain's or hero's objectives. Often in the first chapter, a ship or plane carrying a top-secret, important, or dangerous cargo is lost and never found, until it is recovered by a modern character later in the book.

Cussler's novels, like those of Michael Crichton, are examples of techno-thrillers that do not use military plots and settings. Where Crichton strove for scrupulous realism, however, Cussler prefers fantastic spectacles and outlandish plot devices. The Pitt novels, in particular, have the anything-goes quality of the James Bond or Indiana Jones movies, while also sometimes borrowing from Alistair MacLean's novels. Pitt himself is a larger-than-life hero reminiscent of Doc Savage and other characters from pulp magazines.

Cussler had seventeen consecutive titles reach The New York Times fiction best seller list. In 2014, McFarland Publishing released The Clive Cussler Adventures: A Critical Review by Steven Philip Jones, the first critical review textbook of Cussler's novels.

NUMA
As an underwater explorer, Cussler discovered more than 60 shipwreck sites and wrote non-fiction books about his findings. He was also the founder of the National Underwater and Marine Agency (NUMA), a non-profit organization with the same name as the fictional government agency that employs Dirk Pitt.

Important finds by NUMA include:

 , the ship famed for being the first to come to the aid of  survivors.
 , the first ironclad of the civil war, formerly the icebreaker Enoch Train.

A visual and interactive depiction of Cussler's NUMA Foundation Expeditions has been made available as an extension of NUMA's original website that has since been deleted.

Finds formerly believed to be important include:
 Mary Celeste, the famed ghost ship that was found abandoned with cargo intact (the identification of this wreck as the Mary Celeste has since been placed into a state of question after one researcher disputed the claim's authenticity).

Media appearances
In what started as a joke in the novel Dragon that Cussler expected his editor to remove, he would often write himself into his books. At first he wrote himself simple cameos, but later as something of a deus ex machina, providing the novel's protagonists with an essential bit of assistance or information. Often, the character is given an alias and not revealed as Cussler until his exit with the characters remarking on his odd name. The cameos include the Dirk Pitt Adventures, as well as the Fargo Adventures books Lost Empire, Spartan Gold, Kingdom, and The Tombs. The Tombs also includes his wife, Janet.

There are at least two other types of recurring in-jokes that are less obvious to a casual reader. One is the frequent reuse of the name Leigh Hunt for different characters in different novels. Seventeen books have had a character with this name, frequently in the opening prologues, frequently a sailor, usually dying; a notable exception is the first (in chronological order) Dirk Pitt adventure, Pacific Vortex!, in which Admiral Leigh Hunter is a major character, commander of the 101st Recovery Fleet in Hawaii. In the introduction to Arctic Drift, Cussler says there was a real Leigh Hunt who died in 2007 and the novel is dedicated to him. Another is that significant events in several novels occur on July 15 (Cussler's birthday). He also used the name "Periwinkle" in his works. In The Adventures of Vin Fiz, Sahara, and numerous other works, there appears a donkey named Periwinkle. In Valhalla Rising, the Periwinkle is the name of a catamaran in which Pitt, Giordino, and Misty Graham are rescued by none other than Cussler himself. Cussler's friend Craig Dirgo is mentioned in several books.

Adaptations
 The first film of a Clive Cussler novel was Raise the Titanic! (1980), starring Richard Jordan as Dirk Pitt, Jason Robards as Admiral James Sandecker, David Selby as Gene Seagram, and Anne Archer as Dana Seagram.
 Paramount Pictures released Sahara on April 8, 2005, starring Matthew McConaughey as Dirk Pitt, Steve Zahn as Al Giordino, William H. Macy as Admiral Sandecker, and Penélope Cruz as Eva Rojas. It grossed $122 million with $241 million in production and distribution expenses.

Personal life
Clive Cussler married Barbara Knight in 1955, and they remained married for nearly 50 years until her death in 2003. Together they had three children—Teri, Dirk, and Dayna—four grandchildren, and four great-grandchildren. Cussler's daughter Teri is the creator and manager of the Cussler Museum in Arvada, Colorado, where Cussler's collection of classic automobiles is on display. Cussler married Janet Horvath, who survived him. Clive Cussler was a part-time resident of both Arizona and Colorado.

Cussler died at his home in Paradise Valley, Arizona, on February 24, 2020, at age 88 of undisclosed causes.

Bibliography

Dirk Pitt Adventures

1) Although published in 1983, Pacific Vortex! was written and takes place before The Mediterranean Caper.
2) Also published as Mayday!
3) Novels featuring Dirk Pitt and his children Dirk Pitt, Jr. and Summer Pitt.
4) Novels co-authored with Clive Cussler's son, Dirk.
5) Novels authored by Dirk Cussler

The NUMA Files
This series of books focuses on Kurt Austin, Team Leader of NUMA's Special Assignments division and his adventures. Some characters from the Pitt novels appear such as Sandecker, Al Giordino, Rudi Gunn, Hiram Yaeger and St. Julien Perlmutter. Pitt makes brief appearances in the books Serpent, White Death, Polar Shift, Devil's Gate, The Storm, Zero Hour, and Ghost Ship and is mentioned in Lost City. Juan Cabrillo, the captain of the ship Oregon, also made a brief appearance in The Pharaoh's Secret.

The Oregon Files
This series of books features a ship named the Oregon, which Cussler introduced in the Dirk Pitt Adventures novel Flood Tide (1997). While appearing to be a decrepit freighter, it is actually a high-tech advanced ship used by an unnamed and mysterious "Corporation" under the leadership of Juan Cabrillo. The ship is run like a business, with its crew being shareholders, taking jobs for the CIA and other agencies to help stop crime and terrorism. The crew is adept at disguises, combat, computer hacking and more to aid them in their missions. Kurt Austin, Joe Zavala, and Dirk Pitt all make cameo appearances in the fourth volume, Skeleton Coast (Cabrillo speaks to Pitt on the telephone; and Austin and Zavala appear at the end).

Isaac Bell Adventures
These books are set mostly in the U.S. in the early part of the 20th century. They center around Isaac Bell, a brilliant investigator for the Van Dorn Detective Agency, which appears to be modeled after the real-life Pinkerton Agency. Like Pitt, Bell has an affinity for automobiles and is a crack shot. The first book reveals that Bell survives into 1950 with a wife and grown children. Though the setting is a century ago, the books still qualify as techno-thrillers, since they feature the advanced technology of that time such as private express trains, telegraphs, telephones, dreadnought battleships and early airplanes. Isaac Bell also is a principal character of the background story in the Fargo Adventures novel The Gray Ghost.

Fargo Adventures
The series focuses on Sam and Remi Fargo, a married couple who are professional treasure hunters.

Non-fiction

Children's books

(*) indicates books co-authored with Paul Kemprecos.
(†) indicates books co-authored with Graham Brown.
(††) indicates books authored by Graham Brown.
(‡) indicates books co-authored with Craig Dirgo.
(§) indicates books co-authored with Jack Du Brul.
(§§) indicates books authored by Jack Du Brul.
(‖) indicates books co-authored with Justin Scott.
(^) indicates books co-authored with Grant Blackwood.
(+) indicates books co-authored with Thomas Perry.
(×) indicates books co-authored with Russell Blake.
(≠) indicates books co-authored with Boyd Morrison.
(**) indicates books co-authored with Robin Burcell.
(***) indicates books authored by Robin Burcell.
(╛) indicates books authored by Mike Maden.

References

External links

NUMA website
 
Audio interview with Clive Cussler Talking about The Chase
Clive Cussler Fans Website
The Cussler Museum
 clivecussler.com.au
 Cussler Down Under newsletter
 

 
1931 births
2020 deaths
American adventure novelists
American thriller writers
American spy fiction writers
Techno-thriller writers
American male novelists
20th-century American novelists
21st-century American novelists
Novelists from California
Novelists from Illinois
American underwater divers
American car collectors
Pasadena City College alumni
United States Air Force airmen
United States Air Force personnel of the Korean War
People from Alhambra, California
People from Aurora, Illinois
People from the San Gabriel Valley
American people of English descent
American people of German descent
20th-century American male writers
21st-century American male writers